Gilles Klopman (February 24, 1933 – January 10, 2015) was the Charles F. Mabery Professor of Research in Chemistry, Oncology and Environmental Health Sciences Director of the Laboratory for Decision Support Methodologies at Case Western Reserve University in Cleveland, Ohio, and Adjunct Professor of Environmental and Occupational Health, (University of Pittsburgh)

Dr. Klopman was educated in Belgium and the United States in theoretical chemistry, physical organic chemistry
(L. es Sc., University of Brussels (Belgium), 1956, Dr. es Sc., University of Brussels, 1960, Postdoctoral Fellow, University of Texas, 1965–66)

Structure-Activity Studies of Biologically Active Molecules 
Professor Klopman’s work has involved the evaluation of chemical reactivity and includes experimental determination of reactivity indices and substituent constants to the development of reactivity theories . He has contributed significantly to the concept of charge and orbital controlled reactions where his work is widely used to explain the ambident selectivity of nucleophiles and links the linear free energy type correlations to more fundamental chemical concepts. In the field of quantum mechanics and computers he has designed and programmed the first semi-empirical method for the calculation of the properties of saturated molecules that later became known as MINDO.

His work also encompasses problems of artificial intelligence and its general use to correlate biological data and he has been involved in developing software to represent and manipulate chemical data.

Lately his efforts have focused primarily on the determination of quantitative structure activity relationships in both carcinogenic and chemotherapeutic agents, consisting of developing computer simulations of the actions of drugs, seeking correlations between the chemical structure of the drugs and their activity in order to produce better antitumor agents.

His work has also helped to develop quantitative relationships between the nature and intensity of odors and their chemical structure for the perfume industry. (adapted from the CWRU website for the Dept of Chemistry listed below)

See also
Klopman-Salem equation

External links 

List of publications 

Theoretical chemists
21st-century American chemists
2015 deaths
1933 births